Keith Thompson (born 24 April 1965) is an English former professional footballer who played as a winger. He was born in Birmingham, and is the younger brother of another professional footballer, Garry Thompson. In his career he played in England, Spain & Hong Kong.

Career

 Coventry City FC (1982–85) 12 apps 0 goals
 Wimbledon FC (loan) (1983) 3 apps 0 goals
 Northampton Town FC (loan) (1984) 10 apps 1 goals 
 Real Oviedo (1986–88) 69 apps 9 goals 
 Coventry City FC (1988–90) 11 apps 0 goals
 Real Avilés Industrial (1990–91) 6 apps 1 goal 
 Ernest Borel (1991–93)
 Vasalunds IF (1993) 11 apps 3 goals
 Voicelink (1993-1994) 2 goals
 CD Toledo (1994–95) 22 apps 2 goals

References 

1965 births
Living people
Footballers from Birmingham, West Midlands
English footballers
Association football wingers
Coventry City F.C. players
Wimbledon F.C. players
Northampton Town F.C. players
Real Oviedo players
CD Toledo players
English expatriate footballers
Expatriate footballers in Spain
Expatriate footballers in Hong Kong
English expatriate sportspeople in Hong Kong
English people of Saint Kitts and Nevis descent